Platyptilia ussuriensis is a moth of the family Pterophoridae. It is found in Amur Oblast of Russia.

References

Moths described in 1920
ussuriensis
Endemic fauna of Russia
Taxa named by Aristide Caradja